Guizi is a pejorative Chinese slang term for foreigners. It has had a history of containing xenophobic connotations.

History
Starting with the arrival of European sailors in the sixteenth century, foreigners were often perceived in China as "uncivilized tribes given to mayhem and destruction". Within the southern parts of China, the term gweilo (鬼佬) was used and remains popular today, especially in the Cantonese speaking region of Hong Kong. In northern parts, the term "Occidental devil" (西洋鬼子 xiyáng guǐzi) was used, with Europe being West of China.

Usage
The term gui (鬼) in guizi (鬼子) is an adjective that can be used to express hate and deprecation, an example being the local's expression of their hatred towards the Japanese during their occupation of China in World War II with the same gui (鬼). It conveys a general bad and negative feeling and is a somewhat obsolete and archaic/old-fashioned term nowadays; other more modern terms have largely replaced gui (鬼) for similarly negative meanings.

The character gui (鬼) itself can have negative connotations, even without the word zi (子). For example, when it was attached to the Westerners in the term yang guizi (洋鬼子; lit. "overseas devils") during the Boxer Rebellion, to the Japanese military in the term guizi bing (鬼子兵; lit. "devil soldiers") during the Second Sino-Japanese War, and to the Korean collaborators with the term er guizi (二鬼子; lit. "second-rank devil"). However, the same term can also be applied derogatorily to any foreign military which was an enemy to China. In Taiwan, anti-Japanese demonstrators from the New Party hoisted signs with "Guizi! Get out" (鬼子! 快滾) during the 2012 China anti-Japanese demonstrations.

Related terms 
 Riben guizi or dongyang guizi — used to refer to Japanese. In 2010 Japanese internet users on 2channel created the fictional moe character  which refers to the ethnic term, with Hinomoto Oniko being the Japanese kun'yomi reading of the Han characters "日本鬼子".
 Er guizi — used to refer to ethnic Korean conscripts and parapoliceman who contributed to the Japanese occupation and war effort during the Second Sino-Japanese War and the Pacific War.  It was later extended to refer to all collaborators with the Japanese, including hanjians and Taiwanese conscripts.  In modern times, however, the terms become somewhat synonymous with race traitor, referring to any Chinese nationals and foreign-born ethnic Chinese who act as appeasers or promoters of foreign interests at the expense of Chinese national interests.
 Yang guizi or xiyang guizi — used to refer to Westerners.
 Jia yang guizi — used to refer to "sellout" Chinese who adopt and worship Western values and are shameful/discriminatory to his own ethnic identity and cultural heritage.  Initially used to describe compradors and foreign-educated scholars during the late 19th century, who often dressed and talked like Westerners, the term is now synonymous to race traitors.  A similar word in English is "Uncle Chan", which is derived from Uncle Tom and used to describe a xenophilic Hongkonger (and by further extension any westernized Chinese, regardless of mainland or overseas origin) who are perceived as loathing Chinese identity, supporting Hong Kong independence and pandering to sinophobia in order to gain favor from Westerners.

See also

Ang mo
Gaijin, a Japanese word for foreigners
Jap
The Sword March, the National Revolutionary Army marching cadence which popularized its use against the Japanese
Xiao Riben

References

Anti-Japanese sentiment in China
Anti-Korean sentiment in China
Anti-Western sentiment
China–Japan relations
China–Korea relations
Boxer Rebellion
Chinese words and phrases
Pejorative terms for in-group non-members
Xenophobia in Asia